Aegilops geniculata is a species of grass known by the common name ovate goatgrass. It is native to the Mediterranean and western Asia, including Palestine and the Levant.

Elsewhere it is known as a noxious weed.

External links
Jepson Manual Treatment
USDA Plants Profile
Grass Manual Treatment
Kew GrassBase
Photo gallery

geniculata
Flora of Western Asia
Plants described in 1787
Taxa named by Albrecht Wilhelm Roth
Flora of Malta